Mary Curzon may refer to:
 Mary Curzon, Baroness Curzon of Kedleston, peeress of American background
 Mary Irene Curzon, 2nd Baroness Ravensdale, her daughter
 Mary Curzon, Lady Howe, English aristocrat